Erwin Brazda (14 February 1898 – 18 April 1985) was an Austrian footballer. He played in one match for the Austria national football team in 1922.

References

External links
 
 

1898 births
1985 deaths
Austrian footballers
Austria international footballers
Place of birth missing
Association football goalkeepers